The men's 10000 metres at the 2013 Southeast Asian Games, the athletics was held in Naypyidaw, Myanmar. The track and field events is taking place at the Wunna Theikdi Stadiumon December 17.

Schedule
All times are Myanmar Standard Time (UTC+06:30)

Records

Results

References

Athletics at the 2013 Southeast Asian Games